Doreen Sheila Elsie Keogh (10 April 1924 – 31 December  2017) was an Irish actress of radio, stage, television and film, who was best known for roles in numerous television serials and telefilms, but most especially Concepta Riley the first barmaid, at the Rovers Return Inn in soap opera Coronation Street, as an original character in 1960 until 1975.

Early life 
Keogh was born in Dublin, Ireland, to librarian John Keogh and Alice Mullany. She attended the Holy Faith Convent school, in Clontarf, Dublin, where she first started acting, in addition to being a member of the local amateur dramatics society. Keogh left school at the age of 15 to train with the Abbey Theatre School, Dublin, before moving to London during World War II due to her father's job.  After moving to London, her first role was playing Christine Horan in The Man from Kilsheelan.

Career 
Keogh's first television role came in 1948 as Miss Fulton in crime drama Death at Newtownstewart. She then appeared in a range of other roles, including The Whiteheaded Boy in 1951 and Emergency Ward 10 in 1960, before her debut as Concepta Riley, a barmaid, in the soap opera Coronation Street.

Coronation Street 

Keogh took the role of Concepta Riley, an original cast member and the first barmaid of the pub Rovers Return Inn in Coronation Street, from 1960 (episode 5) until 1964, with return appearances in 1967, 1972 and 1975. The character was devised by Tony Warren, to provide some variation to the north of England accents dominating the original cast.

Riley married Harry Hewitt (Ivan Beavis), a widowed bus inspector, in 1961, and became a stepmother to his daughter, Lucille Hewitt (Jennifer Moss). Keogh was written out of the serial in 1964, when the character and her family returned to Ireland. The departure was part of a cull of more than half a dozen characters by Coronation Street’s new producer, Tim Aspinall, which also included the death of Martha Longhurst (Lynne Carol).

Keogh made several brief returns to Coronation Street. In 1967, Concepta returned with her husband Harry for Elsie Tanner's (Pat Phoenix) wedding, a storyline that saw Harry crushed to death by Len Fairclough’s (Peter Adamson) van after a jack collapsed. Five years later, in 1972, Keogh made another return, with her character marrying Sean Regan (Tony Doyle). In 1975, Concepta admitted to Annie Walker (Doris Speed) that she knew Sean was unfaithful, but she loved him. In total, Keogh appeared in 320 episodes of Coronation Street.

It was during her first stint in the role that she fell for her on-screen husband, Ivan Beavis, and the couple began dating in the 1960s.

Later roles 
After leaving the soap in 1964, Keogh toured with fellow Coronation Street actors Ivan Beavis, Frank Pemberton, Ruth Holden and Lynne Carol in a farce, Coronation Street On The Road, written by Coronation Street writers Vince Powell and John Finch. However, the tour was a failure.

Keogh's later television roles included starring in Z-Cars in 1974, a 1985 comedy drama, Mary in Inside Out, appearing as Imelda Egan in the BBC Northern Ireland drama Ballykissangel from 1997 to 1999, and as Mary Carroll, the Royles' neighbour in the Granada Television comedy The Royle Family between 1998 and 2006. She also had recurring roles in Father Ted and Cold Feet. In Ireland, she became an original cast member of RTÉ's soap opera, Fair City, playing Mary O'Hanlon from 1989 until 1995. Keogh also made a one-off appearance as Mrs Candour in Crossroads in 1969.

She had numerous supporting roles in films, including in the 1996 film Some Mother’s Son, playing a mother superior in the IRA hunger strike. In 1970, she also appeared alongside Julie Andrews and Rock Hudson in the musical Darling Lili.

Keogh coached Barbra Streisand on how to speak with a cockney accent for her 1970 film, On A Clear Day You Can See Forever, despite her being a Dublin native.

In 2007, she appeared in a spoof Irish election commercial on behalf of Alone, a charity for the elderly, as "Betty from the Grey Tigers party". She urged the electorate to vote so that "your granny would be proud of you".

Theatre roles 
Keogh played many theatre roles throughout her career, including in the play Purple Dust in 1953, at Cloyne. She also had roles at West End theatres in London, including a 1973 production of Say Goodnight to Grandma, at St Martin's theatre, Once a Catholic, at Wyndham's theatre in 1978, and Ducking Out in 1982 at Duke of York's theatre. Keogh also played Mrs O'Toole in Look Out ... Here Comes Trouble!, in 1978, at the Donmar Warehouse, and Mrs Madigan in Juno and the Paycock, in 1980, at the Aldwych theatre, as part of the Royal Shakespeare Company.

In Dublin, Keogh appeared in the 1988 Irish premiere of Jeffrey Archer's Beyond Reasonable Doubt at the Gaiety Theatre. In 1992, she took the part of the spiteful mother in Una Pooka at the Tricycle Theatre, Kilburn, London, with later roles including The Silver Tassie, at the Almeida Theatre in 1995, The Importance of Being Earnest at the Abbey Theatre in 1997 and Brian Friel's version of Chekhov's The Three Sisters at Chichester Festival Theatre in 2001.

Personal life and death 
Keogh married actor Frank Singuineau in 1954; however, the marriage ended in divorce in 1963. In 1976, she married her second husband, Jack Jenner, and the couple remained married until Keogh's death. Neither marriage produced children. When she was not acting, Keogh renovated homes with her husband. She was a supporter of Liverpool Football Club and animal welfare charities. Keogh lived in Kent, then County Wicklow, and kept dogs, donkeys and ducks.

Keogh had Alzheimer's disease and died on 31 December 2017, aged 93, at St Columba's Hospital, in Thomastown, County Kilkenny, Ireland. Her funeral took place at St Colmcille's Church, Inistioge, County Kilkenny on 4 January 2018. She is buried in Cappagh Cemetery, Ireland.

Filmography

References

External links

Doreen Keogh at the British Film Institute

1924 births
2017 deaths
Irish film actresses
Irish radio actresses
Irish stage actresses
Irish soap opera actresses
Irish television actresses
Actresses from Dublin (city)
Irish expatriates in England
20th-century Irish actresses
21st-century Irish actresses